The 2022–23 Bahraini FA Cup is the 16th season of the Bahraini FA Cup, the national football cup competition.

Group stage

Group 1

Group 2

Group 3

Group 4

Semi-finals
The four group winners will participate in the semi-finals.

Final
The final will take place on a date to be determined by the two semi-final winners.

References

External links
Soccerway

Bahraini FA Cup seasons
FA Cup
Bahrain